Now That's What I Call Disco or Now Disco is a triple-disc compilation album which was released in the United Kingdom on 26 August 2013. It includes  62    classic hits from the disco era.

Track listing

CD 1
 Chic - Good Times 
 The Jacksons - Shake Your Body (Down to the Ground) 
 Sister Sledge - We Are Family
 The Trammps - Disco Inferno 
 Earth, Wind & Fire - Boogie Wonderland  
 Donna Summer - I Feel Love  
 Diana Ross - Upside Down  
 Village People - Y.M.C.A.  
 Kool & the Gang - Celebration
 Boney M. - Rasputin
 Gloria Gaynor - I Will Survive 
 ABBA - Dancing Queen  
 Tavares -  More Than A Woman
 Ottawan - D.I.S.C.O.
 The Ritchie Family - The Best Disco in Town  
 KC & the Sunshine Band - Get Down Tonight
 Shalamar - A Night to Remember
 Lipps Inc. - Funkytown  
 Evelyn "Champagne" King - Shame 
 Candi Staton - Young Hearts Run Free  
 Rose Royce - Is It Love You're After

CD 2
 Sister Sledge - He's the Greatest Dancer
 KC & the Sunshine Band - That's the Way (I Like It)
 Donna Summer - Hot Stuff
 Diana Ross - I'm Coming Out 
 Rufus & Chaka Khan - Ain't Nobody 
 Labelle - Lady Marmalade  
 Gibson Brothers - Cuba
 Village People - In the Navy 
 Kool & the Gang - Ladies' Night
 The Real Thing - Can You Feel the Force?
 The Gap Band - Oops Up Side Your Head  
 Heatwave - Boogie Nights  
 Michael Zager Band - Let's All Chant
 The Hues Corporation - Rock the Boat 
 Barry White - You're the First, the Last, My Everything  
 George McCrae - Rock Your Baby  
 Van McCoy & The Soul City Symphony - The Hustle
 The Whispers - And the Beat Goes On 
 McFadden & Whitehead - Ain't No Stoppin' Us Now
 Narada Michael Walden - I Shoulda Loved Ya
 Stacy Lattisaw - Jump to the Beat

CD 3
 The Jacksons - Blame It on the Boogie 
 Chic - Le Freak
 Rose Royce - Car Wash 
 Earth, Wind & Fire - September  
 Odyssey - Native New Yorker  
 Sheila B. Devotion - Spacer
 Sylvester - You Make Me Feel (Mighty Real) 
 A Taste Of Honey - Boogie Oogie Oogie
 Silver Convention - Get Up And Boogie  
 Yvonne Elliman - If I Can't Have You  
 Anita Ward - Ring My Bell  
 Cheryl Lynn - Got to Be Real  
 Alicia Bridges - I Love the Nightlife (Disco 'Round)  
 Chaka Khan - I'm Every Woman  
 Thelma Houston - Don't Leave Me This Way
 Yarbrough & Peoples - Don't Stop The Music
 Dan Hartman - Relight My Fire
 Patrice Rushen - Forget Me Nots
 Quincy Jones featuring Dune - Ai No Corrida
 Cerrone - Supernature
 Two Man Sound - Que Tal America

Charts

References

External links 
 Now That's What I Call Disco

2013 compilation albums
Disco
Sony Music compilation albums
EMI Records compilation albums
Universal Music Group compilation albums
Warner Music Group compilation albums